Couffy is a commune in the Loir-et-Cher department of central France.

Population

Sights
The church of Saint-Martin dates from the 11th century, but the only part remaining of the original building is the main doorway in the west tower. The main body of the church was rebuilt towards the end of the 12th century in the Primitive Gothic style. The nave was remodelled towards the end of the 15th century with ribbed vaulting spanning three bays.

See also
Communes of the Loir-et-Cher department

References

Communes of Loir-et-Cher